This page lists the results of leadership elections held by the Liberal Party of Newfoundland and Labrador.

1949 leadership convention

(Held April 28, 1949)
Joey Smallwood acclaimed

1969 leadership convention

(Held November 1, 1969)

Joey Smallwood 1070
John Crosbie 440
Alexander Hickman 187
Randolph Joyce 13
Peter Cook 3
Vincent Spencer 1

1972 leadership convention

(Held February 5, 1972)

Edward Roberts 564
Tom Burgess 82
Rod Moores 14
Vincent Spencer 3

1974 leadership convention

(Held October 26, 1974)

First Ballot:
Edward Roberts 337
Joey Smallwood 305
Roger Simmons 57
Steve Neary 24

Second Ballot (Neary eliminated):
Edward Roberts 403
Joey Smallwood 298
Roger Simmons 7

1977 leadership convention

(Held October 15, 1977)

First Ballot:
Edward Roberts 356
Steve Neary 238
Bill Rowe 159
Roger Simmons 115
Hugh Shea 2

Second Ballot (Shea eliminated):
Edward Roberts 378
Steve Neary 220
Bill Rowe 150
Roger Simmons 100

Third Ballot (Simmons eliminated):
Edward Roberts 373
Bill Rowe 227
Steve Neary 215

Fourth Ballot (Neary eliminated):
Bill Rowe 439
Edward Roberts 376

1979 leadership election
Following Rowe's resignation on May 27, 1979 the Party Executive elected Don Jamieson leader.

1980 leadership convention

(Held November 1, 1980)

Len Stirling 666
Les Thoms 140
Ted Noseworthy 1

Stirling was personally defeated in the 1982 general election. On October 16, 1982 Steve Neary was named interim leader.

1984 leadership convention

(Held October 13, 1984)

Leo Barry 517
Eugene Hiscock 51
Hugh Shea 24

1987 leadership convention

(Held June 5, 1987)
Clyde Wells 564
Winston Baker 67
Ted Noseworthy  10

1996 leadership convention
(Held January 17, 1996)

Brian Tobin acclaimed

Tobin resigned as premier and leader on October 16, 2000. Beaton Tulk was chosen interim leader and premier.

2001 leadership convention

(Held February 3, 2001)

First Ballot:
Roger Grimes 609
John Efford 546
Paul Dicks 111

Second Ballot (Dicks eliminated):
Roger Grimes 638
John Efford 624

Grimes resigned on May 30, 2005 and Gerry Reid was named interim leader.

2006 leadership convention

(Held February 6, 2006)

Jim Bennett acclaimed

Bennett resigned as leader on May 8, 2006. Gerry Reid once again became interim leader and was elected by the executive as permanent leader on May 29, 2006. Reid was personally defeated in the 2007 General Election and resigned. Yvonne Jones was named interim leader on November 15, 2007.

May 2011 leadership convention

(Held May 28, 2011)

Yvonne Jones acclaimed
Jones resigned on August 9, 2011. The Party Executive elected a successor on August 14.

August 2011 leadership election

(Held August 14, 2011 - secret ballot by party executive, vote totals not released)

Kevin Aylward elected
Brad Cabana
Bern Coffey
Danny Dumaresque
Ryan Lane
Rodney Martin
Charles Murphy

Aylward was defeated in the 2011 general election and resigned effective January 3, 2012. Dwight Ball was chosen interim leader.

2013 leadership convention

(Held November 15–17, 2013)

 = Winner

2020 leadership convention

(Held August 3, 2020) after Dwight Ball announced his pending resignation in February 2020.

References

Carty, Kenneth R et al., Leaders and Parties in Canadian Politics: Experiences of the Provinces. Harcourt Brace Jovanovich Canada, 1992.

See also
Leadership convention
Liberal Party of Newfoundland and Labrador